Glen Max Morris (March 13, 1925 – January 8, 1998) was an American professional basketball and American football player. He was a consensus All-American in both sports for Northwestern University and later played professional football for the Chicago Rockets and Brooklyn Dodgers of the All-America Football Conference. He also played in the NBA for the Sheboygan Red Skins.

Biography
Morris was born in Norris City, Illinois and attended Frankfort Community High School in West Frankfort, Illinois where the high school gymnasium is named after Morris. He later attended the University of Illinois and Northwestern University.

Morris was the last Northwestern athlete to be selected as a first-team All-American in two sports.  He was a consensus All-American football player at the end position in 1945. That year, Morris set a Big Ten Conference single-game record with 158 receiving yards in a game against Minnesota.

Morris was also selected as a consensus All-American basketball player at the forward position in 1946. He won the Big Ten Conference basketball individual scoring championship in both 1945 and 1946.

After graduating from Northwestern, Morris played three seasons of professional football in the All-America Football Conference for the Chicago Rockets (1946–1947) and Brooklyn Dodgers (1948).  He played in a total of 39 professional football games and had 53 receptions for 677 yards.

Besides playing professional football, Morris played four seasons of professional basketball in the NBL and NBA with the Chicago American Gears and the Sheboygan Red Skins.

In 1984, Morris was a charter inductee into the Northwestern Athletics Hall of Fame.

See also
1945 College Football All-America Team
1946 NCAA Men's Basketball All-Americans

References

1925 births
1998 deaths
All-American college football players
All-American college men's basketball players
American men's basketball players
Basketball players from Illinois
Centers (basketball)
Chicago American Gears players
Chicago Rockets players
Forwards (basketball)
Northwestern Wildcats football players
Northwestern Wildcats men's basketball players
People from White County, Illinois
Players of American football from Illinois
Sheboygan Red Skins players